Rainbow Hospice and Palliative Care, founded in 1981, is one of the oldest and largest non-profit hospice and palliative care providers in Illinois.

With main offices at 1550 Bishop Court in Mt. Prospect and additional offices in Elgin and Urbana, Rainbow serves patients in seven counties throughout Illinois: Cook, DuPage, Kane, Kendall, Lake, McHenry and Will counties.

Rainbow Hospice and Palliative Care is accredited by the Community Health Accreditation Program (CHAP) as of 2013. As an accrediting body, CHAP has regulatory authorization to survey agencies providing home health and hospice services, to determine whether they meet the Medicare Conditions of Participation (COPs).

History

Early History
Founder Betty Brosius was inspired to create a hospice organization when dealing with the struggles of her husband's terminal illness. After her husband's death in 1979, Brosius, along with her minister, a social worker and a friend made a plan to provide end-of-life care to the terminally ill. Rainbow Hospice was officially formed in the winter of 1981-1982.

Communities
After serving a dozen families following its formation in 1981, Rainbow outgrew its space in Des Plaines. Beginning in 1990, Rainbow Hospice moved to several new locations before acquiring its former main office location at 444 North Northwest Highway in Park Ridge, Illinois. In May 2011, Rainbow Hospice moved their main office to 1550 Bishop Court, Mount Prospect.

Betty Brosius
Founder Betty Brosius continued working with Rainbow Hospice until her retirement in early 2004. In 2003, Betty was diagnosed with terminal non-alcoholic cirrhosis and became a patient of Rainbow Hospice who cared for her until her death in March 2004.

Inpatient Unit
In 2006, Rainbow Hospice began the creation of an Inpatient Unit, a specialized facility used by hospices to serve critical care patients in an environment where they have 24-hour access to direct care.  After a year of planning and renovation, the Rainbow Hospice Ark, a 15-room Inpatient Unit, opened on November 11, 2007.

The Rainbow Hospice Ark is located in a self-contained wing at St. Matthews Center for Health in Park Ridge, IL, a long-term facility that was built in 1959. In 2008, the Ark was awarded a design merit citation by Healthcare Design Magazine.

Hospice and Palliative Care Services

Hospice Care
Hospice care takes place wherever the patient considers home—whether that is at their house or in a skilled nursing facility or long term care facility.

Ark Inpatient Unit
The Rainbow Hospice Ark inpatient unit is designed to offer short-term care to patients who are experiencing pain or other symptoms associated with their terminal illness that is not manageable in other settings. The goal is to stabilize patients so they may return to their home environment.

The 14-bed Ark unit currently resides at Avantara Park Ridge until July 31, 2016, when the Ark will move to Presence Resurrection Medical Center, 4th floor East.

Palliative Care
A recent partnership with Presence Health enables Rainbow Hospice and Palliative Care to deliver palliative care services to more patients throughout Illinois.

Grief and Loss Services
Rainbow Hospice and Palliative Care offers ongoing bereavement support to families of Rainbow patients and to anyone in the community grieving the loss of a loved one.

Rainbow Grief and Loss Services offers individual counseling sessions as well as the following support groups: General Grief Groups (Available in Mt. Prospect, Elgin and Aurora), Spousal Loss, Adult Loss of Parent, Adult Loss of Sibling, The Wellspring Series, Grief and the Holidays, Spanish Language Grief and Loss, Addiction-Related Loss.

Grief in School Program
The Good Mourning staff also provides assistance to schools in need of bereavement services. Rainbow Hospice provides intervention teams for crisis consultation and debriefing for indictments in schools. In conjunction with the LIFE Institute for Learning, bereavement staff also provides grief management training to professionals in schools and colleges.

LIFE Institute
Rainbow Hospice and Palliative Care is committed to educating healthcare professionals on the most current and up-to-date issues in end-of-life care. Rainbow's educational programs offer information on advanced planning, clinical care, dementia-specific issues, spirituality and integrative therapies and living with loss. Continuing Education (CEU) opportunities are available to nurses, social workers and educators.

Education for Healthcare Professionals
Rainbow Hospice and Palliative Care is committed to educating healthcare professionals on the most current and up-to-date issues in end-of-life care. Rainbow's educational programs offer information on advanced planning, clinical care, dementia-specific issues, spirituality and integrative therapies and living with loss. Continuing Education (CEU) opportunities are available to nurses, social workers and education professionals.

Community Education
Rainbow Hospice and Palliative Care's trained professionals provide education and outreach to nearby communities. Rainbow offers community education about completing advanced directives, hiring a caregiver and more.

Volunteerism
Rainbow's robust volunteer base consists of hundreds of volunteers who provide critical services and support to Rainbow's mission. At 10.4%, Rainbow far surpasses the Medicare requirement of 5% for volunteer hours.

Rainbow Hospice and Palliative Care volunteers provide patient care and family support, administrative and office support, bereavement support and help with outreach and development.

See also
 Grief & trauma counseling
 Grief counseling
 Grief therapy
 Hospice

References

External links 
 Rainbow Hospice Homepage
 Hospice Foundation of America
 Hospice Association of America
 National Hospice & Palliative Care Organization

Palliative care in the United States
Healthcare in Chicago
Charities based in Illinois
Park Ridge, Illinois
Hospices in the United States
Medical and health organizations based in Illinois